

Offseason
July 31: The school hired two assistant coaches for the 2009–10 season. Tracey DeKeyser will act as the interim head coach while Peter Johnson and Jackie Friesen will fill in as short term assistants. Actual head coach Mark Johnson takes a one-year leave of absence to coach the U.S. women's team in the 2010 Winter Olympics in Vancouver.
August 1: Former Wisconsin goaltender, Jessie Vetter has been named a finalist for the Women's Sports Foundation's Sportswoman of the Year award. Vetter is one of ten finalists selected for the 2009 honor which fans can vote for to determine the ultimate winner.
August 15: Hockey Canada announced that Badgers players Mallory Deluce and Stefanie McKeough have been selected for Canada's National Women's Under-22 Team. The club will take part in a three-game series against Canada's National Women's Team from August 17–20 at Father David Bauer Olympic Arena in Calgary. Deluce was a member of Canada's National Women's Under-22 Team during the 2008–09 season. McKeough won a silver medal with Canada's National Women's Under-18 Team at the 2009 IIHF World Women's Under-18 Championship in Fussen, Germany.
August 24: Two current and six former Badgers were selected to the 23-player roster for the U.S. Women's National Team.  Five of the Badgers were part of the 2009 NCAA championship team, which includes Patty Kazmaier Award winner Jessie Vetter, Erika Lawler, Meghan Duggan, Hilary Knight and Angie Keseley. Former Badgers Kerry Weiland and Molly Engstrom were named to the squad. Engstrom is the only Badger with Olympic experience representing Team USA. Knight and Duggan will redshirt the 2009–10 season at Wisconsin to train with the U.S. National Team. Keseley is one of two players selected who has not played on a U.S. National Team prior to the selection.
September 9: The WCHA announced that Wisconsin defenseman Brittany Haverstock and forwards Brooke Ammerman, Mallory Deluce and Jasmine Giles have been named as WCHA All-Stars. The three players are among 22 players from the conference to face the 2009-10 U.S Women's National Team in St. Paul, Minn. on September 25.
September 24: The Badgers are the preseason pick to win the Western Collegiate Hockey Association women's title, according to a poll of league coaches. The Badgers collected six first-place votes and 48 points in a poll of the eight coaches.

Regular season
October 5: The Wisconsin Badgers women's hockey team was ranked No. 4 in the country. The USCHO.com officials revealed it in their first Top-10 Women's Hockey Poll of the season. Wisconsin accumulated 112 points and one first place vote.
January 5: In an exhibition game against Wisconsin, former Wisconsin player Jinelle Zaugg-Siergiej netted a goal and had an assist as the American Olympic Hockey Team won by a score of 9–0.
The Wisconsin women's team will play host to the Camp Randall Hockey Classic on Feb. 6, 2010 at Camp Randall Stadium. The UW women's hockey program will take on the Bemidji State Beavers outdoors at the stadium as part of their weekend series, while the men's program will follow against the Michigan Wolverines in what will serve as the United States Hockey Hall of Fame Game.
Feb 6: The No. 9 Wisconsin women's hockey team (16-10-3, 13-9-1 WCHA) defeated the Bemidji State Beavers (8-14-7, 7-9-7 WCHA), 6–1, in the first ever Culver's Camp Randall Hockey Classic at Camp Randall Stadium. The Badgers played in front of an NCAA-record crowd of 8,263 fans in the second-ever women's hockey outdoor showdown.  Sophomore Carolyne Prevost scored the first goal in Camp Randall history at the 16:53 mark  and backhanded it in to put the Badgers up 1–0.  The Badgers dominated offensively, outshooting the Beavers 42–13. Freshman Becca Ruegsegger (Lakewood, Colo.) finished with 13 saves in net for Wisconsin,

Standings

Roster
 Brianna Decker was named WCHA Rookie of the Week after a two-goal game against North Dakota and a series against Ohio State. Against the Buckeyes, she recorded a five-point series and her first collegiate hat trick as the Badgers split with Ohio State from Jan. 29–30.
Jasmine Giles  recorded eight points in three games from Feb. 14-20 (five goals, three assists)
Caroline Prevost recorded her first career hat trick against St. Cloud on Jan. 22 had a three-game assist and career-high three-game point streak from 10/11-24

Schedule

Player stats

Skaters

Goaltenders

Postseason

WCHA playoffs

Awards and honors
Brianna Decker, WCHA Rookie of the Week (Week of October 5)
Brianna Decker, Badgers Rookie of the Year (2009–10)
Carolyne Prevost, WCHA Offensive Player of the Week (Week of January 25)
Becca Ruegsegger, WCHA Defensive Player of the Week (Week of November 2)
Becca Ruegsegger, Wisconsin, WCHA Defensive Player of the Week (Week of January 11) 
Kyla Sanders, Frozen Four Skills Competition participant
Jessie Vetter, Sportswoman of the Year by Women's Sports Foundation

Preseason honors
WCHA Preseason Player of the year: Brooke Ammerman
WCHA Preseason Rookie of the year: Brianna Decker

References

External links
Official site

Wisconsin
Wisconsin Badgers women's ice hockey seasons
Wiscon
Wiscon